Karen Tumulty (born December 1, 1955) is a political columnist for The Washington Post. Before joining the Post, Tumulty wrote for Time from October 1994 to April 2010. She was a Congressional Correspondent, as well as the National Political Correspondent based in Washington D.C. for the magazine.

Life 
Tumulty graduated from David Crockett High School in Austin, Texas in May 1973. She later graduated in 1977 from the University of Texas at Austin with a BA in Journalism with high honors; she is an alumna of the Alpha Xi Delta sorority. She wrote for The Daily Texan student newspaper. She received an MBA from Harvard Business School in 1981. Tumulty is married to Paul Richter and has two sons, Nicholas and Jack. She is Catholic.

Career 
Tumulty began her career in 1977 at the now-defunct San Antonio Light. Tumulty spent 14 years with the Los Angeles Times, covering the US Congress, economics, business, energy, and general-assignment beats. While at the Times, she won the Gerald Loeb Award for distinguished business and financial journalism in 1982 for Large Newspapers, and the National Press Foundation's Edwin Hood Award for diplomatic correspondence in 1993.

Tumulty joined Time in 1994. She covered Congress for two years, during which time she reported and wrote the magazine's 1995 "Man of the Year" profile of Newt Gingrich. In 1996, she became a White House Correspondent, writing major stories on President Bill Clinton and Hillary Clinton. She became the National Political Correspondent in 2001.

In 1997, then-Vice-President Al Gore was having a late-night conversation with Tumulty and New York Times reporter Rick Berke aboard Air Force Two when he casually mentioned that he has either read or was told that he and his wife Tipper's early pre-marital relationship in Boston while Gore was at Harvard was the basis for the protagonists of the book and movie Love Story by Erich Segal, Oliver & Jenny Barrett.  Berke later stated that Gore didn't offer it as a fact and that it was just second-hand info from a Nashville Tennessean article or reporter who had interviewed Segal, so Berke decided not to mention it in his article since it was not offered as a fact by Gore.  However, Tumulty included the story in her own article and presented it as though Gore claimed it as fact, which claim was picked up by numerous publications afterward as being another example of Gore bragging about an incident that was either a lie or misleading.  Segal then went public to clarify that Gore was half of the basis for Oliver Barrett, which was the familial emotional baggage part, while the other half (athletic & poetic) was based on actor Tommy Lee Jones, and that he knew Tipper then, but that she was not a basis for the book and movie at all, nor was the Gore's relationship, and offered that the Tennessee reporter either misquoted him or exaggerated the story. Segal had also attended Harvard, but had done so mostly a decade or so earlier between 1954 to 1959, then later obtained his doctorate at Harvard in 1965.  Segal met both the Gores and Jones while on sabbatical at Harvard in 1968 just after his college years.

In the 2008 Presidential campaign, Tumulty accused the campaign of Senator John McCain of "playing the race card" for a television ad criticizing the connections between Senator Barack Obama and Franklin Raines, the former CEO of Fannie Mae. Tumulty wrote that the ad displayed "sinister images of two black men, followed by one of a vulnerable-looking elderly white woman." The McCain campaign pointed out that they had also produced an ad criticizing the connections of Barack Obama to Jim Johnson, another former Fannie Mae CEO who is white. According to the McCain campaign, Tumulty did not correct her post, but responded with "I grew up in Texas. I know what this stuff looks like." The McCain campaign accused Tumulty of "hysterical liberal bias."

In 2010, Tumulty joined The Washington Post, where she received the 2013 Toner Prize for Excellence in Political Reporting. She became a political columnist in 2018. In 2021, she was named deputy editorial page editor.

Tumulty's coverage of health care reform issues has been informed by her personal experience with her brother Patrick's health problems.

Besides her work in print journalism, she has appeared as a television/webcasting news analyst on the public affairs programs Washington Week on PBS, PBS NewsHour, and Special Report with Bret Baier on Fox News (as part of the 'All-Star Panel').

Admiral William H. McRaven, her fifth grade classmate and commander of USSOCOM, was her guest at the 2012 White House Correspondents' Association Dinner. Adm. McRaven commanded JSOC when it planned and carried out Operation Neptune Spear, the U.S. Navy SEAL raid that killed Osama bin Laden.

See also 
 Fox 'All-Star Panel' members
 Washington Week panelists

References

External links 

 Tumulty on Twitter
 Washington Week profile
 TIME Magazine articles by Tumulty
 
 
 

1955 births
The Washington Post people
Time (magazine) people
Harvard Business School alumni
Living people
Journalists from San Antonio
Moody College of Communication alumni
American newspaper reporters and correspondents
Journalists from Texas
Catholics from Texas
20th-century Roman Catholics
21st-century Roman Catholics
Gerald Loeb Award winners for Large Newspapers
20th-century American journalists
20th-century American women writers
21st-century American journalists
21st-century American women writers